Mertzon is a city in and the county seat of Irion County, Texas, United States. Its population was 781 according to the 2010 census. It is part of the San Angelo, Texas, metropolitan statistical area.

Geography

Demographics

2020 census

As of the 2020 United States census, there were 747 people, 356 households, and 264 families residing in the city.

2000 census
As of the census of 2000, 839 people, 315 households, and 239 families resided in the city. The population density was 551.4 people per square mile (213.1/km). There were 364 housing units at an average density of 239.2/sq mi (92.5/km). The racial makeup of the city was 85.22% White, 0.60% African American, 0.36% Native American, 11.68% from other races, and 2.15% from two or more races. Hispanics or Latinos of any race were 34.21% of the population.

Of the 315 households, 34.0% had children under the age of 18 living with them, 61.9% were married couples living together, 9.2% had a female householder with no husband present, and 24.1% were not families. About 21.3% of all households were made up of individuals, and 12.1% had someone living alone who was 65 years of age or older. The average household size was 2.66 and the average family size was 3.09.

In the city, the population was distributed as 28.8% under the age of 18, 6.2% from 18 to 24, 27.4% from 25 to 44, 22.4% from 45 to 64, and 15.1% who were 65 years of age or older. The median age was 37 years. For every 100 females, there were 95.6 males. For every 100 females age 18 and over, there were 95.7 males.

The median income for a household in the city was $33,333, and for a family was $40,417. Males had a median income of $33,438 versus $17,250 for females. The per capita income for the city was $17,795. About 8.9% of families and 9.6% of the population were below the poverty line, including 8.4% of those under age 18 and 11.7% of those age 65 or over.

Education 
The City of Mertzon is served by the Irion County Independent School District and home to the Irion County High School Hornets.

Notable people

 Laura Bullion, female Old West outlaw, was born in Knickerbocker

References

Cities in Texas
Cities in Irion County, Texas
County seats in Texas
San Angelo, Texas metropolitan area